Jeffrey Heath (born November 29, 1949) is Professor of Historical Linguistics, Morphology, Arabic and Linguistic Anthropology at the University of Michigan, US. He is known particularly for his work in historical linguistics and for his extensive fieldwork.

He received his B.A. summa cum laude from Harvard College in 1971, the M.A. from the University of Chicago in 1973, and his Ph.D. from the same institution in 1976.

From 1973 to 1977 he was a research fellow at the Australian Institute of Aboriginal Studies. From 1977 to 1982 he was assistant professor of linguistics at Harvard, from 1982 to 1985, associate professor. In 1987 he moved to the University of Michigan as visiting associate professor. He has held the rank of professor since 1989.

His research is based on more than ten years of fieldwork: first on Australian languages (1970s; primarily in Arnhem Land on Gunwinyguan and Yolŋu languages), then on Muslim and Jewish vernaculars of Maghrebi Arabic (1980s), and since 1990 on languages of Mali in West Africa: Tamashek (Tuareg, Berber family), five Songhay languages, and since 2004 several of the Dogon languages (with Brian Cansler, Vadim Dyachkov, Abbie Hantgan, Laura McPherson, Steven Moran, Kirill Prokhorov, and the late Stephan Elders) including Jamsay.

Publications
Linguistic Diffusion in Arnhem Land. Canberra: AIAS, pp. 146, 1978.
Ngandi Grammar, Texts, and Dictionary. Canberra: AIAS, pp. 297, 1978.
Basic Materials in Ritharngu: Grammar, Texts, and Dictionary. Pacific Linguistics B-62. Canberra: Australian National University, pp. 249, 1980.
Basic Materials in Warndarang: Grammar, Texts, and Dictionary. Pacific Linguistics, C-60. Canberra: Australian National University, pp. 174, 1980.
Nunggubuyu Myths and Ethnographic Texts.  Canberra:  AIAS, pp. 556, 1980.
Dhuwal (Arnhem Land) Texts on Kinship and Other Subjects, with Grammatical Sketch and Dictionary. Oceana Linguistic Monographs, 23. Sydney: University of Sydney, pp. 241, 1980
Basic Materials in Mara: Grammar, Texts, and Dictionary. Pacific Linguistics C-60. Canberra: Australian National University, pp. 522, 1981.
Nunggubuyu Dictionary. Canberra: AIAS, pp. 399, 1982
Functional Grammar of Nunggubuyu. Canberra: Australian Institute of Aboriginal Studies, pp. 664, 1984.
Ablaut and Ambiguity: Phonology of a Moroccan Arabic Dialect.  Albany: State University of New York Press, pp. 366, 1987.
Texts in Koroboro Senni, Songhay of Gao, Mali. (Wortkunst und Dokumentartexte in afrikanischen Sprachen, 6) Cologne:  Rüdiger Köppe Verlag, pp. viii, 283, 1988 (facing English translations; material from Gao and Bamba).
From Code-Switching to Borrowing: A Case Study of Moroccan Arabic. (Library of Arabic Linguistics, 9) London and New York: Kegan Paul International, pp. 328, 1989.
Dictionnaire Songhay-Anglais-Français. Paris: l'Harmattan. Vol. 1: Koyra Chiini, pp. 264. Vol. 2: Djenne Chiini, pp. 202. vol. 3: Koroboro Senni, pp. 344. 1998.
Texts in Koyra Chiini, Songhay of Timbuktu, Mali. (Wortkunst und Dokumentartexte in afrikanischen Sprachen, 5) Cologne: Rüdiger Köppe Verlag, pp. 389, 1998 (facing English translations; material from Gao and Bamba).
A Grammar of Koyra Chiini, the Songhay of Timbuktu. (Mouton Grammar Library.) Berlin/New York: Mouton de Gruyter, pp. xv, 453, 1998.
Grammar of Koyraboro (Koroboro) Senni, the Songhay of Gao. Cologne: Rüdiger Köppe Verlag, pp. 403, 1999.
Jewish and Muslim Dialects of Moroccan Arabic. London: Curzon, pp. 559, 2002.
Hassaniya Arabic (Mali) Poetic and Ethnographic Texts. Wiesbaden: Harrassowitz, pp. 207, 2003.
Hassaniya Arabic (Mali) - French - English Dictionary. Wiesbaden: Harrassowitz, pp. 338, 2004.
Tondi Songway Kiini (montane Songhay, Mali): Reference grammar and TSK-English-French Dictionary. CSLI [distributed by University of Chicago Press], pp. 440, 2005.
A Grammar of Tamashek (Tuareg of Mali). (Mouton Grammar Library.) Berlin/New York: Mouton de Gruyter, pp. 745, 2005.
Tamashek Texts from Timbuktu and Kidal. (Berber Linguistics Series.) Cologne: Koeppe Verlag, pp. 164, 2005.
Dictionnaire tamachek - anglais - francais. Paris: Karthala, pp. 848, 2006.
A Grammar of Jamsay. (Mouton Grammar Library.) Berlin/New York: Mouton de Gruyter, pp. 735, 2008.

References

External links
 Homepage

Linguists from the United States
Historical linguists
Anthropological linguists
Harvard College alumni
University of Chicago alumni
University of Michigan faculty
Living people
1949 births
Linguists of Muskogean languages